The steam car manufacturers listed here were mostly active during the first period of volume production, roughly 1860–1930, with a peak around 1900. From 1940 onwards, steam cars have tended to be either experimental or prototypes.

The first experimental steam-powered vehicles were built in the 18th and 19th centuries, but it was not until after Richard Trevithick had developed the use of high-pressure steam, around 1800, that mobile steam engines became a practical proposition. The first half of the 19th century saw great progress in steam vehicle design, and by the 1850s it was viable to produce them on a commercial basis. The next sixty years saw continuing improvements in vehicle technology and manufacturing techniques and steam road vehicles were used for many applications. In the 20th century, the rapid development of internal combustion engine technology led to the demise of the steam engine as a source of propulsion of vehicles on a commercial basis prior to World War II. Since then there have been sporadic resurgences of interest in steam, particularly in the late 1960s in California to address air pollution issues and later in response to the 1973 oil crisis.

1600s – Concepts

1700s – Pioneers

1800s – Early developments

1890s – Commercial manufacture

1900 to 1913 – Volume production
The early years of the 20th century, prior to World War I, were the heyday of the steam car.

1914 to 1939 – Decline
The steam cars of this era up until the 1930s were the last steam-powered production cars. The power advantages that steam had possessed were overtaken by the improvements to the petrol powered internal combustion engines.

1940 to date – Renewed interest
Makes in this era are generally prototypes or experimental.

See also

Clayton Wagons Ltd.
List of traction engine manufacturers
History of steam road vehicles
History of the automobile
Steam car
Steam bus
Steam wagon

References

Steam cars
Steam cars manufacturers
Steam cars
Cars